Leon Lyon (3 August 1918 – 17 January 2003) was a Puerto Rican sports shooter. He competed at the 1960 Summer Olympics and the 1964 Summer Olympics in the Men's Rapid-Fire Pistol, 25 metres event.

References

1918 births
2003 deaths
Puerto Rican male sport shooters
Olympic shooters of Puerto Rico
Shooters at the 1960 Summer Olympics
Shooters at the 1964 Summer Olympics
People from Payette, Idaho
Sportspeople from Idaho
Pan American Games medalists in shooting
Pan American Games bronze medalists for Puerto Rico
Shooters at the 1959 Pan American Games
20th-century Puerto Rican people